CS BC Farul Constanța was a Romanian professional basketball club, based in Constanța, Romania. After a few years of financial trouble, BC Farul withdrew from the championship and was dissolved in the summer of 2014. After the dissolution of BC Farul, Athletic Constanța has remained the main basketball team in Constanța.

References

Defunct basketball teams in Romania
Basketball teams established in 2000
Basketball teams disestablished in 2014
2000 establishments in Romania
2014 disestablishments in Romania